Raúl Mazza (1888–1948) was an Argentine painter.

Works

Still Life with Fruit (1927)
The Harvest (1938).

People from Buenos Aires
1888 births
1948 deaths
20th-century Argentine painters
Argentine male painters
20th-century Argentine male artists